Synapsin-3 is a protein that in humans is encoded by the SYN3 gene.

This gene is a member of the synapsin gene family. Synapsins encode neuronal phosphoproteins which associate with the cytoplasmic surface of synaptic vesicles. Family members are characterized by common protein domains, and they are implicated in synaptogenesis and the modulation of neurotransmitter release, suggesting a potential role in several neuropsychiatric diseases. The protein encoded by this gene shares the synapsin family domain model, with domains A, C, and E exhibiting the highest degree of conservation. The protein contains a unique domain J, located between domains C and E. Based on this gene's localization to 22q12.3, a possible schizophrenia susceptibility locus, and the established neurobiological roles of the synapsins, this family member may represent a candidate gene for schizophrenia. The TIMP3 gene is located within an intron of this gene and is transcribed in the opposite direction. Alternative splicing of this gene results in six transcript variants; however, only two variants have been fully described.

References

Further reading

Biology of bipolar disorder